Robert W. Hines (1912-1994), was an American wildlife artist who had a long career with the United States Fish and Wildlife Service. 

Born in Columbus, Ohio, Hines had virtually no formal training in art or in wildlife science, yet by the age of twenty-seven he was working as staff artist with the Ohio Division of Wildlife, and in 1947 (or 1948) he accepted a similar position with the United States Fish and Wildlife Service (USFWS). He illustrated many works for the USFWS, including Ducks at a Distance, Migration of Birds, Fifty Birds of Town and City, Wildlife Portrait Series (including Song Birds and Alaska). His illustrations were also used in such works as Wildlife in America by Peter Matthiessen, Ducks, Geese, and Swans of North America (both the Bellrose edition and the new 2014 edition by Guy Baldassarre), Runes of the North by Sigurd F. Olson and in Rachel Carson's Under the Sea Wind.

References

Juriga, John D. Bob Hines:  National Wildlife Artist.  Beaver's Pond Press, Edina, MN.  2012.

External links

USFWS, Ducks at a Distance—brief biography
biography at Russell Fink Gallery

Fifty Birds of Town and City: Complete book online.
USFWS line art by Bob Hines

1912 births
1994 deaths
American bird artists
American illustrators